Antonio Petrocelli (born 18 September 1953) is an Italian actor.

Partial filmography

Film

 The Pool Hustlers (1982)
 The Eyes, the Mouth (1982)
 Secrets Secrets (1985)
 Il tenente dei carabinieri (1986)
 The Strangeness of Life (1987)
 Italian Night (1987)
 It's Happening Tomorrow (1988)
 Caruso Pascoski di padre polacco (1988)
 Willy Signori e vengo da lontano (1989)
 Red Wood Pigeon (1989)
 The Yes Man (1991)
 Donne con le gonne (1991)
 Un'altra vita (1992)
 Sud (1993)
 Where Are You? I'm Here (1993)
 Caro diario (1993)
 Who Killed Pasolini? (1995)
 The Second Time (1995)
 La scuola (1995)
 Vesna Goes Fast (1996)
 The Barber of Rio (1996)
 An Eyewitness Account (1997)
 Mr. Fifteen Balls (1998)
 Outlaw (1999)
 Johnny the Partisan (2000)
 Nightwatchman (2000)
 Caruso, Zero for Conduct (2001)
 The Son's Room (2001)
 Azzurro (2001)
 El Alamein: The Line of Fire (2002)
 The Caiman (2006)

TV

 Don Matteo (2001)
 Valeria medico legale (2002)
 Imperium: Augustus (2003)
 Benedetti dal Signore (2004)
 Il mammo (2004-2007)
 I Cesaroni (2006-2012)
 Un medico in famiglia (2014)
 1993 (2017)
 The New Pope (2019)

References

External links
 

1953 births
Living people
Italian male film actors
20th-century Italian male actors
21st-century Italian male actors